H.W.A. (an initialism of Hoez With Attitude) is an American all-female hip hop trio, composed of Jazz, Diva and Baby Girl; Diva was later on replaced by Go-Di. They were active between 1989 and 1994, and reformed in April 2012.

History
The three members came together in 1989, and soon secured an independent label from Drive-By Records to record their first album Livin in a hoe house. The album was not a huge success, only making it to #38 on the Top R&B/Hip-Hop Albums chart, but the group became known for its sexually explicit lyrics and they were soon signed to Eazy-E's Ruthless Records.  Their second album, Az Much Ass Azz U Want, was even less of a success, briefly reaching #71 on the Top R&B/Hip-Hop Albums chart.  They also made a cameo appearance in Eazy-E's "diss" song to Dr. Dre and Snoop Dogg, "Real Muthaphuckkin G's".

In 1993, H.W.A. released a single called "All That (Juzt a Little Action", which received a generous amount of airtime due to the involvement of Eazy-E.

In 1994, H.W.A. released a remix album called I Ain't No Lady.  Afterwards, H.W.A disbanded.

In April 2012, according to Jazz, H.W.A. reformed.

Discography

References

External links
 
 H.W.A. at Discogs
 https://open.spotify.com/artist/3chMMhnzIqwETgeOurCqP4

Hip hop groups from California
Women hip hop groups
American musical trios
Ruthless Records artists
Musical groups from Los Angeles
Musical groups established in 1989
Musical groups disestablished in 1994
Musical groups reestablished in 2012
Musicians from Compton, California
American women rappers
African-American women rappers
African-American musical groups